Mihailo Anušić (born 1985) is a Serbian fashion designer behind the clothing brand "Mihano Momosa". He is known for designing "romantic looking" bridal gowns, feather dresses and puffy skirts, as well as accessories.

Education
Anušić was born in  1985 in Zrenjanin, where he also attended high school. He then studied at the Faculty of Technical Sciences in Novi Sad.

Career 
Anusic began his career as a stylist before founding his label "Mihano Momosa" in 2011. That same year, he had his debut at Belgrade Fashion Week with his first collection "Olivera". Soon after, he opened a studio in Novi Sad and continued to regularly present at Belgrade Fashion Week. His 2013 collection "Rare", seen at the Belgrade show, was described as being a "combination of romanticism, elegance and unrivaled charm.". In 2016, his pieces were viewed as being "light and feminine, with soft hues." He has also presented collections in Zagreb and at Paris Fashion Week.

Anusic's dresses are handmade and often decorated with "lace, feathers, flowers, pearls and other magical details". Relying mostly on pastel colours, he also designs silky blouses and puffy skirts adorned with rose appliques. He cites the emotion love as his main source of inspiration. In 2018, Serbian model Anja Stojković wore one of his bridal dresses at her wedding. In 2017, the editor of Vogue Arabia, Dene Aljuhani Abdulaziz, was seen wearing a  "Mihano Momosa" feathered dress.

Awards 
At Belgrade Fashion Week 2013, Anusic won the prize for best fashion show from Grazia Magazine Serbia. In 2017, he won for Best Designer at The Elle Style Awards in Belgrade.

Collections 

 Olivera
 SS 2012
 Resort 2012
 Sea 2012
 Spring Summer 2013 - Love
 Fall 2013 - I give you my spring
 Spring Summer 2014 - Rare
 Fall 2014
 Spring Summer 2015
 Prefall 2015
 Spring Summer 2016
 Fall 2015
 Spring Summer 2017

References

External links 
 
 Instagram page

Serbian fashion designers
1985 births
Living people
Wedding dress designers